Gosforth High may refer to:

Gosforth High School, A high school in Gosforth, Newcastle upon Tyne, England
Gosforth High Street, The High Street in the Gosforth suburb of Newcastle upon Tyne, England